La notte di un nevrastenico is a 1959 one-act opera by Nino Rota for Milan, to a libretto by Riccardo Bacchelli.

References

Italian-language operas
Operas by Nino Rota
1959 operas
Operas
One-act operas